Mela Lee is an American voice actress based in Los Angeles who voices characters on a number of animated series, films, television shows and video games. She is best known as the voice of Jade in Mortal Kombat 11. In anime, she voices lead characters Rin Tosaka, in Fate/stay night as well as Fate/stay night: Unlimited Blade Works and the film trilogy Fate/stay night: Heaven's Feel; Yuki Cross in Vampire Knight; Shinku the fifth Rozen Maiden doll in Rozen Maiden; and Erica Karisawa in the Durarara!! series, which was broadcast on Adult Swim. In animation, she is the voice of Tikki in Miraculous: Tales of Ladybug & Cat Noir, which airs on Disney Channel and Netflix, and Kikimora in The Owl House. In video games, she voices Lifeline in Apex Legends, Rena Ryūgū in Higurashi When They Cry, Rachel Alucard in the BlazBlue series, Tiki in the Fire Emblem series and Super Smash Bros. Ultimate, and Sharon Kreuger and Scarlet in The Legend of Heroes: Trails of Cold Steel series.

Career
Lee first got into voice acting when she auditioned for Vampire Princess Miyu, but the director had her read for Saint Tail, and she was cast as the title character Meimi Haneoka, whom assumes the secret identity of Saint Tail. She would later land the vampire role of Yuki Cross in the Vampire Knight series and Rin Tosaka, the heroine of the Fate/stay night series. She also played the lead heroine in Rozen Maiden. Lee has also served as an ADR Voice Replacement specialist in over 100 projects, including Suicide Squad, Gotham, Detroit, Zero Dark Thirty, Atlanta, and The Good Wife.

In addition to voice acting, Lee is the lead singer, composer, and lyricist for her band Magnolia Memoir. She and fellow voice actress Erica Lindbeck host their own web series called Lindbeck and Lee with voice actor guests.

Filmography

Anime

Animation

Films

Video games

Awards and nominations 
In 2015, Lee was nominated for the BTVA Anime Dub Award for Best Female Lead Vocal Performance in an Anime Television Series/OVA for her role as Rin Tohsaka in Fate/stay night: Unlimited Blade Works.

References

External links

Living people
Actresses from Los Angeles
American video game actresses
American voice actresses
Pepperdine University alumni
Place of birth missing (living people)
21st-century American actresses
21st-century American women singers
21st-century American singers
Year of birth missing (living people)
American people of Chinese descent